is a former Japanese football player. He played for Japan national team.

Club career
Kishioku was born in Muroran on April 2, 1954. After graduating from high school, he joined Nippon Steel in 1973. He played 121 games and scored 1 goal in Japan Soccer League Division 1.

National team career
On May 31, 1979, Kishioku debuted for Japan national team against Indonesia. He played at 1980 Summer Olympics qualification. He played 10 games and scored 2 goals for Japan until 1980.

National team statistics

References

External links
 
 Japan National Football Team Database

1954 births
Living people
Association football people from Hokkaido
Japanese footballers
Japan international footballers
Japan Soccer League players
Nippon Steel Yawata SC players
Association football defenders
People from Muroran, Hokkaido